Aces of the Galaxy is a downloadable rail shooter, developed by Artech Digital Entertainment and published by Sierra Online for the Xbox Live Arcade. The game was released on June 4, 2008. The Windows version is available on Steam.

Gameplay

Reception

IGN awarded Aces an 8.4 of 10, stating, "Aces of the Galaxy is a solid, well-balanced space shooter." Official Xbox Magazine said the game was "So mindlessly enjoyable that you'll soar right past [its] flaws."

See also
Aces of the Pacific
Star Fox

References

External links
Aces of the Galaxy preview on IGN
Xbox Page

2008 video games
Rail shooters
Video games developed in Canada
Windows games
Xbox 360 Live Arcade games
Xbox 360 games
Artech Studios games
Multiplayer and single-player video games